The Finn European Championship is an annual European Championship sailing regatta in the Finn (dinghy) classes organised by the International Finn Association.

Editions

Medalists

References

European championships in sailing
Finn competitions
Recurring sporting events established in 1956